Carex conoidea is a tussock-forming species of perennial sedge in the family Cyperaceae. It is native to south eastern parts of Canada and north eastern parts of the United States.

See also
List of Carex species

References

conoidea
Taxa named by Carl Ludwig Willdenow
Plants described in 1805
Flora of Arkansas
Flora of Connecticut
Flora of Delaware
Flora of Illinois
Flora of Indiana
Flora of Maine
Flora of Manitoba
Flora of Maryland
Flora of Massachusetts
Flora of Michigan
Flora of Minnesota
Flora of Missouri
Flora of New Brunswick
Flora of New Hampshire
Flora of New Jersey
Flora of New York (state)
Flora of Newfoundland
Flora of North Carolina
Flora of Nova Scotia
Flora of Ohio
Flora of Ontario
Flora of Quebec
Flora of Rhode Island
Flora of Vermont
Flora of Virginia
Flora of Wisconsin